Pirita is one of the eight administrative districts of Tallinn, the capital of Estonia.

Pirita occupies a relatively big area, but compared to other districts of Tallinn its population of 17,592 (as of 1 November 2014) is relatively small. It mostly consists of private houses, instead of the large blocks of flats typical of some other districts of Tallinn, such as Lasnamäe and Mustamäe. Large parts of the district consist of newly built, modern buildings and houses. Pirita Beach is located in Pirita.

Pirita is one of the most prestigious and wealthiest districts of Tallinn, partly thanks to natural benefits such as its beach and yachting harbour. Pirita beach is the largest in Tallinn, and in the summer can attract up to 30,000 visitors a day.

Population

Pirita has a population of 17,592.

Subdistricts
Pirita is divided into 9 subdistricts: Iru, Kloostrimetsa, Kose, Laiaküla, Lepiku, Maarjamäe, Merivälja, Mähe and Pirita.

Landmarks
Pirita monastery
Tallinn TV Tower
Tallinn Botanic Garden
Pirita Yachting Centre
Pirita Beach
Metsakalmistu cemetery
Pärnamäe cemetery
Pirita Velodrome

Gallery

References

External links

Districts of Tallinn